The 2020 Arkansas–Pine Bluff Golden Lions football team represented the University of Arkansas at Pine Bluff in the 2020–21 NCAA Division I FCS football season. The Golden Lions were led by first-year head coach Doc Gamble and played their home games at Simmons Bank Field in Pine Bluff, Arkansas as members of the West Division of the Southwestern Athletic Conference (SWAC).

On July 20, 2020, the Southwestern Athletic Conference announced that it would not play fall sports due to the COVID-19 pandemic, which includes the football program. The conference is formalizing plans to conduct a competitive schedule for football during the 2021 spring semester.

Schedule
Due to the SWAC's postponement of the 2020 football season to spring 2021, games against Bethune–Cookman, Miami (OH), and Troy were canceled. The SWAC released updated spring schedules on August 17.

Game summaries

at Southern

at Grambling State

at Mississippi Valley State

Prairie View A&M

vs. Alabama A&M

References

Arkansas-Pine Bluff
Arkansas–Pine Bluff Golden Lions football seasons
Arkansas-Pine Bluff Football